Axiocerses amanga, the bush scarlet, is a butterfly of the family Lycaenidae. It is found in Sub-Saharan Africa.

The wingspan is 24–28 mm for males and 25–30 mm for females. Adults are on the wing year-round in South Africa.

The larvae feed on Acacia species, Ximenia americana and X. caffra. They are associated with the ant species Camponotus niveosetosus.

Subspecies
Axiocerses amanga amanga
Range: South Sudan, Ethiopia, Uganda, Kenya, Tanzania, south-eastern DRC, Angola, Malawi, Zambia, Mozambique, Zimbabwe, Botswana, Namibia, Eswatini and South Africa, where it is present in Limpopo, Mpumalanga, North West, Gauteng and KwaZulu-Natal provinces
Axiocerses amanga borealis Aurivillius, 1905
Range: Senegal, Mali, Guinea, Burkina Faso, Ivory Coast, Ghana, Togo, Nigeria, Niger, northern Cameroon
Axiocerses amanga baumi Weymer, 1901
Range: Angola, Namibia

References

External links

Butterflies described in 1881
Axiocerses
Butterflies of Africa
Taxa named by John O. Westwood